This is a list of Time Team special episodes that aired between 1997 and 2014. These special episodes often depart somewhat from the regular Time Team format, by revisiting previous sites to do a follow-up story; travelling outside the UK to excavate other sites of interest; chronicling digs overseen by other organisations; or using information gleaned from other Time Team episodes to draw a more complete picture of ordinary life during a particular historical era. Other specials may focus on a dig with a particular holiday theme; a more complex excavation over a longer period than the standard three days; or a visit to a particularly famous historical site.

Most shows fit within a 1-hour time-slot (approx. 46–49 minutes of content), although some (e.g. episodes 3, 9, 26, 33, 35, 36) are longer at 1.25 hours of content, and some (i.e. episode 24) at 1.75 hours. Regular contributors include: presenter Tony Robinson; archaeologists Mick Aston, Phil Harding, Carenza Lewis, Helen Geake; historians Francis Pryor; Robin Bush, Guy de la Bedoyere, Sam Newton, Alex Langlands; illustrator Victor Ambrus; landscape investigator Stewart Ainsworth; geophysics John Gater, Chris Gaffney; surveyor Henry Chapman; and, Roman specialist Mark Corney.

Episodes (1997-2000)

1997

1999

2000

Episodes (2001-2005)

2001

2002

2003

2004

2005

Episodes (2006-2010)

2006

2007

2008

2009

2010

Episodes (2011-2014)

2011

2012

2013

2014

See also
 List of Time Team Episodes
 Time Team Live
 Time Team History Hunters
 Time Team Digs
 Time Team Extra
 Time Team America
 Time Team Others

References

External links
 Time Teamat Channel4.com
 The Unofficial Time Team site Fan site
 

Time Team